High-altitude military parachuting, or military free fall (MFF), is a method of delivering military personnel, military equipment, and other military supplies from a transport aircraft at a high altitude via free-fall parachute insertion. Two techniques are used: HALO (high altitude – low opening, often called a HALO jump) and HAHO (high altitude – high opening).

In the HALO technique, the parachutist opens the parachute at a low altitude after free-falling for a period of time, while in the HAHO technique, the parachutist opens the parachute at a high altitude just a few seconds after jumping from the aircraft.

Although HALO techniques were first developed in the 1960s for military use, in recent years HALO parachute designs have been more widely used in non-military applications, including as a form of skydiving.

In military operations, HALO is also used for delivering equipment, supplies, or personnel, while HAHO is generally used exclusively for personnel.

High Altitude Low Opening – HALO 
The origins of the HALO technique date back to 1960 when the United States Air Force began conducting experiments that followed earlier work by Colonel John Stapp in the late 1940s through early 1950s on survivability for pilots ejecting at high altitude. Stapp, a research biophysicist and medical doctor, used himself in rocket sled tests to study the effects of very high g-forces. He later helped develop pressure suits and ejection seats, which have been used in jets ever since. Kittinger's friend and United States Naval Parachute Test Jumper Joe Crotwell was also among the consultants and test jumpers of the original program. The first time the technique was used for combat was during the Vietnam War in Laos by members of MACV-SOG Recon Team Florida. SEAL Teams of the United States Navy expanded the HALO technique to include delivery of boats and other large items.

The technique is used to airdrop supplies, equipment, or personnel at high altitudes, where aircraft can fly above surface-to-air missile (SAM) engagement levels through enemy skies without posing a threat to the transport or load. In the event that anti-aircraft cannons are active near the drop zone, the HALO technique also minimizes the parachutist's exposure to flak.

For military cargo airdrops, the rigged load is cut free and rolls out of the plane as a result of gravity. The load then proceeds to fall under canopy to a designated drop zone.

In a typical HALO exercise, the parachutist will jump from the aircraft, free-fall for a period of time at terminal velocity, and open his parachute at an altitude as low as  AGL depending on the mission. The combination of high downward speed, minimal forward airspeed, and the use of only small amounts of metal helps to defeat radar and reduces the amount of time a parachute might be visible to ground observers, enabling a stealthy insertion.

High Altitude High Opening – HAHO 
The HAHO technique is used to airdrop personnel at high altitudes when aircraft are unable to fly above enemy skies without posing a threat to the jumpers. In addition, HAHO parachute jumps are employed in the covert insertion of military personnel (generally special operations forces) into enemy territory, in circumstances where the covert nature of an operation may be compromised by the loud noise of parachutes opening at low altitude.

In a typical HAHO exercise, the jumper will jump from the aircraft and deploy the parachute immediately after exiting the aircraft. The jumper will use a compass or GPS device for guidance while flying for 30 or more miles (50 kilometers). The jumper must use way points and terrain features to navigate to their desired landing zone and correct their course to account for changes in wind speed and direction. If deploying as a team, the team will form up in a stack while airborne with their parachutes. Usually, the jumper in the lowest position will set the travel course and act as a guide for the other team members. HAHO insertions (excluding training) are intended to be executed at night.

Whilst in the British Special Forces (22 SAS), due to his extensive skydiving background, Charles "Nish" Bruce was pivotal in the original trials and development of the HAHO tactic now routinely used as a conflict insert for special forces.

Military Free-Fall – MFF 
In the United States, military personnel who intend to participate in high-altitude military operations must undergo intense training with strict rules and regulations. Military free-fall is one of the most dangerous and physically demanding skills in special operations. MFF operations are typically done under the cover of darkness, so as to hide the operator's presence from opposing forces.

The transition into being military free-fall certified starts with successfully completing the static-line certification at Fort Bragg, North Carolina. The military free-fall course is also instructed at Fort Bragg and spans four weeks. The first week of the course students will learn how to stabilize their body in flight in a specially constructed vertical wind tunnel.

Health risks 

All types of parachuting techniques are dangerous, but HALO/HAHO carry special risks. At high altitudes (greater than ), the partial pressure of oxygen in the Earth's atmosphere is low. Oxygen is required for human respiration and lack of pressure can lead to hypoxia. Also, rapid ascent in the jump aircraft without all nitrogen flushed from the bloodstream can lead to decompression sickness, also known as caisson disease or "the bends".

A typical HAHO exercise will require a pre-breathing period (30–45 minutes) prior to jump where the jumper breathes 100% oxygen in order to flush nitrogen from their bloodstream. Also, a HAHO jumper will employ an oxygen bottle during the jump. Danger can come from medical conditions affecting the jumper. For example, cigarette smoking, alcohol and drug use (including antihistamines, sedatives, and analgesics), anemia, carbon monoxide, fatigue and anxiety can all lead to a jumper being more susceptible to hypoxia. In addition, problems with the oxygen bottle and during the changeover from the pre-breather to the oxygen bottle can result in the return of nitrogen to the jumper's bloodstream and, therefore, an increased likelihood of decompression sickness  A jumper suffering from hypoxia may lose consciousness and therefore be unable to open his parachute. A jumper suffering from decompression sickness may die or become permanently disabled from nitrogen bubbles in the bloodstream, which causes inflammation of joints.

Another risk is from the low ambient temperatures prevalent at higher altitudes. However, HAHO jumpers generally wear polypropylene knit undergarments and other warm clothing under a windproof shell to prevent this.

HALO carries the additional risk that if the parachute fails to deploy or lines become tangled, there is less time to resort to the reserve (back-up parachute) or untangle the lines.

A retrospective study pinpointed 134 parachutists with 141 injuries. All these injuries were a result of members in HALO training. The most common injuries found were fractures, which accounted for 35% of the total injuries. Muscle sprains accounted for 34.7% of injuries. Other proportionally higher injuries were dislocations at 9.9%, contusions at 7.8%, and cuts and lacerations at 4.9%. The article also noted that two deaths occurred while the study was being conducted.

Example of use 
 The first combat high-altitude jump took place during the Vietnam War in November 1970, when a six-man team called SOG Recon Team Florida parachuted from  into Laos.
 BJ Worth, a professional stuntman doubling as James Bond, is shown in the 1997 film Tomorrow Never Dies performing a HALO jump.
 In November 2001, a small team of U.S. troops from the 75th Ranger Regiment Regimental Reconnaissance Company freefall parachuted into Afghanistan in order to establish a landing strip.
 In 2002, United States Air Force Pararescue jumpers conducted a HALO jump in Afghanistan as a means of reaching a gravely wounded member of the Australian Special Air Service who was stranded in a minefield.
 Free fall parachute insertions were utilized during Operation Iraqi Freedom, as a means of bypassing enemy early warning systems.
 In 2009, during the rescue of Captain Richard Phillips off the coast of Somalia, a team of U.S. Navy SEALs carried out a nighttime HALO jump into the sea in order to reach the USS Bainbridge which was towing a lifeboat containing Philips' hostage takers.
 In 2012, U.S. Navy SEALs used the technique to insert into Somalia to rescue two hostages being held by pirates near the town of Adow.
 Tom Cruise became the first actor to perform a HALO jump on camera for the 2018 film Mission: Impossible – Fallout.
 In April 2020, military personnel from the Russian Airborne Forces, by the order of the Minister of Defence, Sergey Shoygu, performed the world's first HALO paradrop from the lower border of the Arctic stratosphere.

List of HALO/HAHO capable units

See also 
 Project Excelsior
 John Stapp
 Billy Waugh
 List of paratrooper forces
 Military Freefall Parachutist Badge

Notes

References 
 Black, Mike. HALO jump over Yuma Proving Ground, AZ. U.S. Marine Corps. United States of America.
 Divine, Mark (2004). Navy SEALs Air Operations – Free Fall: HALO/HAHO (used with permission). U.S. Navy SEAL 1989 to present. Founder of NavySEALs.com.
 McKenna, Pat (July 1997). A Bad Altitude. Airman Magazine. U.S. Air Force. United States of America.
 McManners, Hugh (2003), Ultimate Special Forces, pub Dorling Kindersley 
 U.S. Army Infantry School (November 1, 1995). Lesson 3: Airlift Requests and Personnel Used in Airborne. Fundamentals of Airborne Operations, Edition B. U.S. Army Infantry School. US Army. United States of America.
 U.S. DOD (June 5, 2003). US DOD Dictionary of Military Terms: Joint Acronyms and Abbreviations. U.S. Department of Defense. United States of America.
 https://web.archive.org/web/20100106010349/http://www.airpower.maxwell.af.mil/airchronicles/aureview/1986/nov-dec/boyd.html
 http://www.globalsecurity.org/military/ops/airborne-halo-haho.htm

External links 

 

Military parachuting
Airborne warfare